Edmund Ironside (30 November 1016; , ; sometimes also known as Edmund II) was King of the English from 23 April to 30 November 1016. He was the son of King Æthelred the Unready and his first wife, Ælfgifu of York. Edmund's reign was marred by a war he had inherited from his father; his cognomen "Ironside" was given to him "because of his valour" in resisting the Danish invasion led by Cnut the Great.

Edmund was not expected to be King of England; however, by June 1014 two elder brothers had died, making him heir apparent. At the end of the same year, England was conquered by Sweyn Forkbeard, who died shortly thereafter. Æthelred was able to reclaim the throne, despite opposition. Sweyn's son, Cnut, was defeated and returned to Denmark, where he assembled an invasion force to reconquer England. It would not arrive for another year.

After regaining the throne, the royal family set about strengthening its hold on the country with the assistance of Eadric Streona (Edmund's brother-in-law). People who had sided with the Danes in 1014 were punished, and some were killed. In one case, two brothers, Morcar and Sigeferth, were killed and their possessions were taken by Æthelred. Sigeferth's widow  Ealdgyth was imprisoned within a monastery, but she had already captured Edmund's attention. Cnut returned to England in August 1015. Over the next few months, Cnut pillaged most of England. Edmund joined Æthelred to defend London, but in 1016 Edmund unofficially named himself the Earl of the East Midlands and raised a revolt against his father. Without the king's permission he took Ealdgyth from the monastery, and married her; it would have been a politically advantageous marriage, since she was a member of one of the strongest families in the Midlands.

Æthelred died on 23 April 1016, making Edmund king. It was not until the summer of 1016 that any serious fighting was done: Edmund fought five battles against the Danes, ending in his defeat on 18 October at the Battle of Assandun, after which they agreed to divide the kingdom, Edmund taking Wessex and Cnut the rest of the country. Edmund died shortly afterwards on 30 November, leaving two sons, Edward and Edmund; however, Cnut became king of all England, and exiled the remaining members of Edmund's family.

Early life
The exact date of Edmund's birth is unclear, but it could have been no later than 993 when he was a signatory to charters along with his two elder brothers. He was the third of the six sons of King Æthelred the Unready and his first wife, Ælfgifu, who was probably the daughter of Earl Thored of Northumbria. His elder brothers were Æthelstan (died 1014) and Egbert (died c. 1005), and younger ones, Eadred, Eadwig and Edgar. He had four sisters, Eadgyth (or Edith), Ælfgifu, Wulfhilda, and the Abbess of Wherwell Abbey.  His mother died around 1000, after which his father remarried, this time to Emma of Normandy, who had two sons, Edward the Confessor and Alfred and a daughter Goda.

Æthelstan and Edmund were close, and they probably felt threatened by Emma's ambitions for her sons. The Life of Edward the Confessor, written fifty years later, claimed that when Emma was pregnant with him, all Englishmen promised that if the child was a boy they would accept him as king.

Warrior prince
When Sweyn Forkbeard seized the throne at the end of 1013 and Æthelred fled to Normandy, the brothers do not appear to have followed him, but stayed in England. Æthelstan died in June 1014 and left Edmund a sword which had belonged to king Offa of Mercia. His will also reflected the close relationship between the brothers and the nobility of the East Midlands.

Sweyn died in February 1014, and the Five Boroughs accepted his son Cnut as king. However, Æthelred returned to England and launched a surprise attack which defeated the Vikings and forced Cnut to flee England. In 1015 Sigeferth and Morcar came to an assembly in Oxford, probably hoping for a royal pardon, but they were murdered by Eadric Streona. King Æthelred then ordered that Sigeferth's widow, Ealdgyth, be seized and brought to Malmesbury Abbey, but Edmund seized and married her in defiance of his father, probably to consolidate his power base in the East Midlands. He then received the submission of the people of the Five Boroughs. At the same time, Cnut launched a new invasion of England. In late 1015 Edmund raised an army, possibly assisted by his wife's and mother's links with the midlands and the north, but the Mercians under Eadric Streona joined the West Saxons in submitting to Cnut. In early 1016 the army assembled by Edmund dispersed when Æthelred did not appear to lead it, probably because of illness. Edmund then raised a new army and in conjunction with Earl Uhtred of Northumbria ravaged Eadric Streona's Mercian territories, but when Cnut occupied Northumbria Uhtred submitted to him, only to be killed by Cnut. Edmund went to London.

King of England
Æthelred died on 23 April 1016, and the citizens and councillors in London chose Edmund as king and probably crowned him, while the rest of the Witan, meeting at Southampton, elected Cnut. Edmund then mounted a last-ditch effort to revive the defence of England. While the Danes laid siege to London, Edmund headed for Wessex, where the people submitted to him and he gathered an army. He fought inconclusive battles against the Danes and their English supporters at Penselwood in Somerset and Sherston in Wiltshire. He then raised the siege of London, which had been successfully resisted by the citizens, and defeated the Danes near Brentford. They renewed the siege while Edmund went to Wessex to raise further troops, returning to again relieve London, defeat the Danes at Otford, and pursue Cnut into Kent. Eadric Streona now went over to Edmund, but at the decisive Battle of Assandun on 18 October, Eadric and his men fled and Cnut decisively defeated Edmund. There may have been one further battle in the Forest of Dean, after which the two kings, persuaded by the Witan, negotiated a peace dividing the country between them. Edmund received Wessex while Cnut took Mercia and probably Northumbria.

Death

On 30 November 1016, Edmund died. The location of his death is uncertain, though it is generally accepted that it occurred in London, rather than in Oxford where Henry of Huntingdon claimed it to be in his version of events, written perhaps a century later, which included Edmund's death from multiple stab-wounds whilst he was defecating on a privy. Geoffrey Gaimar narrates a similar occurrence with the weapon being a crossbow; but with a number of other medieval chroniclers, including the Encomium Emmae Reginae, not mentioning murder, it is thought Edmund's cause of death may possibly have been wounds received in battle or some disease. It is certainly possible, however, that he was murdered.

Edmund was buried near his grandfather King Edgar the Peaceful at Glastonbury Abbey in Somerset. However, the abbey was destroyed during the Dissolution of the Monasteries in the 16th century, and any remains of a monument or crypt may have been plundered; hence the location of his remains is unclear.

Reputation
In the view of M. K. Lawson, the intensity of Edmund's struggle against the Danes in 1016 is only matched by Alfred the Great's in 871, and contrasts with Æthelred's failure. Edmund's success in raising one army after another suggests that there was little wrong with the organs of government under competent leadership. He was "probably a highly determined, skilled and indeed inspiring leader of men". Cnut visited his tomb on the anniversary of his death and laid a cloak decorated with peacocks on it to assist in his salvation, peacocks symbolising resurrection.

Descendants
Edmund had two children by Ealdgyth: Edward the Exile and Edmund Ætheling. According to John of Worcester, Cnut sent them to Sweden where he probably hoped they would be murdered and forgotten, but King Olof of Sweden instead forwarded them on to Kiev, where his daughter Ingegerd was the grand princess. The boys eventually ended up in Hungary where Edmund died but Edward prospered. Edward returned from exile to England in 1057 only to die within a few days of his arrival. His son Edgar Ætheling was briefly proclaimed king after the Battle of Hastings in 1066, but later submitted to William the Conqueror. Edgar lived a long and eventful life: fighting in rebellion against William the Conqueror from 1067 to 1075; fighting alongside the Conqueror's son Robert Curthose in campaigns in Sicily (1085–1087); and accompanying Robert on the First Crusade (1099–1103). He was still alive in 1125.

In 1070 Edward the Exile's daughter, Margaret, became queen of Scotland. Through her and her descendants, Edmund is the ancestor of subsequent British monarchs.

In culture

 Edmund Ironside is an Elizabethan play about him, which some critics believe to be a very early work by William Shakespeare.
 Edmund is played by John Horn in the 1970 television movie The Ceremony of Innocence.
 Edmund is one of the main characters in Justin Hill's novel Shieldwall (2011), first in the Conquest Trilogy.
 Edmund is a recurring character in the 2022 Netflix historical drama series Vikings: Valhalla, played by Louis Davison.

See also
 House of Wessex family tree

References

Notes

Citations

Sources

 Anglo-Saxon Chronicle
 Clemoes, Peter. The Anglo-Saxons: Studies Presented to Bruce Dickins, 1959

External links
 Edmund II at the official website of the British monarchy
 

Monarchs of England before 1066
10th-century births
1016 deaths
Burials at Glastonbury Abbey
Anglo-Saxon warriors
10th-century English people
11th-century English monarchs
Christian monarchs
House of Wessex